Robin Marshall Gregory (1936 – 2004) was an English sound engineer. He was nominated for two Academy Awards in the category Best Sound.

Selected filmography
 The Deep (1977)
 Outland (1981)

References

External links

English audio engineers
1936 births
2004 deaths